Johannes "Jan" Jiskoot (born 3 March 1940 in Dordrecht) is a retired Dutch swimmer who won two medals in medley events at the 1962 European Aquatics Championships. He also participated in the 1960 and 1964 Summer Olympics and was sixth in the 400 m medley. He started as a backstroke swimmer, but then leaned more to butterfly and medley. On 18 September 1962 he set the European 100 m batterfly record at 0:59:50, becoming the first European to swim 100 m butterfly within one minute. Between 1960 and 1966 he was 14 times national champion and set more than 20 national records in various backstroke, butterfly and medley events.

References

1940 births
Living people
Dutch male medley swimmers
Dutch male backstroke swimmers
Dutch male butterfly swimmers
Olympic swimmers of the Netherlands
Swimmers at the 1960 Summer Olympics
Swimmers at the 1964 Summer Olympics
Sportspeople from Dordrecht
European Aquatics Championships medalists in swimming
21st-century Dutch people